Palaeostoidae is an extinct family of air-breathing land snails, terrestrial gastropod mollusks in the superfamily Clausilioidea (according to the taxonomy of the Gastropoda by Bouchet & Rocroi, 2005).

Subfamilies and genera 
The family Palaeostoidae consists of the following subfamilies and genera:

References